Hans Julius Eriksen Norbye (born 16 January 1987) is a Norwegian footballer who currently plays for Alta.

Career
Norbye was born and grew up in Karasjok. He was regarded as having talent for athletics during his younger days, but joined Tromsø IL to play youth football. He represented Norway internationally on youth level at the time. In 2006, he spent time on loan in Alta IF.

After the 2006 season he signed his first professional contract with Tromsø IL. He got one game in the Norwegian Premier League in 2007.

He was loaned out to Tromsdalen UIL for one month in 2007, and later for the entire 2008 season. He then permanently joined Tromsdalen for free ahead of the 2009 season.

On 19 January 2019, Norbye signed with HamKam on a free transfer.

Career statistics

Club

References

1987 births
Living people
People from Karasjok
Norway youth international footballers
Norwegian footballers
Tromsø IL players
Alta IF players
Tromsdalen UIL players
Hamarkameratene players
Eliteserien players
Norwegian First Division players
Norwegian Second Division players
Association football defenders
Sportspeople from Troms og Finnmark